(died 699) was a daughter of Emperor Tenji in Japan during the Asuka Period. Her mother was Lady Tachibana, whose father was Abe no Kurahashi Maro. Her elder sister was Princess Asuka.

She was a consort (妃, Hi) of Emperor Tenmu. One of her sons, Prince Toneri, was promoted in the Imperial Court.

References 

Japanese princesses
699 deaths
Year of birth unknown
Emperor Tenmu
Daughters of emperors